Ronald Allan Kelley Poe (August 20, 1939 – December 14, 2004), known professionally as Fernando Poe Jr., and often referred to by his initials FPJ, was a Filipino actor, film director, producer, screenwriter, and politician. He also wrote, directed, and produced several of the films he starred in—under the pseudonyms Ronwaldo Reyes and D'Lanor.

Poe appeared in around 300 films spanning from 1955 to 2003. The teenage Poe joined the film industry as a stuntman after the untimely death of his father, actor Fernando Poe Sr. His film debut was Anak ni Palaris (1955), a sequel to a film that starred his father. His breakout came in the 1956 film Lo Waist Gang and went on to star in action films that portrayed him as the "champion and defender of the poor and oppressed". His notable films include: Only the Brave Know Hell (1965), Lino Brocka's Santiago! (1970), Celso Ad. Castillo's Asedillo (1971), Bato sa Buhangin (1976), Durugin si Totoy Bato (1979), Eddie Romero's Aguila (1980); his self-directed Ang Panday (1980) and its sequels; Roman Rapido and Isang Bala Ka Lang! (both 1983), the 1986 films Iyo ang Tondo, Kanya ang Cavite, Muslim .357, and Batang Quiapo; Kahit Konting Pagtingin (1990), Ang Probinsyano (1996), Isusumbong Kita sa Tatay Ko... (1999), and Ang Dalubhasa (2000).

Poe's accolades include five FAMAS Awards for Best Actor—a joint record that inducted him into the FAMAS Hall of Fame in 1988. He also won Best Director for his films Ang Padrino (1984) and Kahit Butas ng Karayom, Papasukin Ko (1995). In 2004, FAMAS posthumously granted him the Natatanging Alagad ng Sining Award. Poe was also posthumously declared a National Artist of the Philippines in 2006 (accepted by his family in 2012).

Poe ran for president of the Philippines in the 2004 election. He lost to re-electionist Gloria Macapagal Arroyo by just over one million votes (3.48%)—the closest margin between the winner and runner-up in the history of Philippine presidential elections. Seven months after the elections, Poe died of a stroke; hundreds of thousands attended his wake and funeral.

Poe was married to actress Susan Roces, who played his onscreen love interest in 17 films. Senator Grace Poe and actress Lovi Poe are his daughters.

Early life and education
Ronald Allan "Ronnie" Kelley Poe was the son of Filipino actor and director Fernando Poe Sr. (born Allan Fernando Poe y Reyes; 1916–1951), a mestizo of Spanish descent from San Carlos, Pangasinan and Elizabeth "Bessie" Kelley (1917–1999), a mestiza with Irish American ancestry. He was born in Manila on August 20, 1939.

His parents were not legally married when he was born, they were later married in 1940. In 2004, Poe's political opponents tried to derail his bid for the 2004 Philippine presidency when they sought to disqualify him as an illegitimate son of a non-Filipino mother.

He was the second among six siblings and it from his brother Andy (born Fernando Poe Jr.; 1943–1995) - whose given name was used by Poe as his own professional name to bank on the popularity of his father who was a top actor in his time. Conrad Poe was Poe's half-brother, the illegitimate son of Fernando Poe Sr. and actress Patricia Mijares.

The original spelling of the family surname was Pou, from his paternal grandfather, playwright Lorenzo Pou, a Catalan migrant from Majorca, Spain, who ventured into mining and business in the Philippines.

In 1953, Poe finished his primary education at San Beda College, Lepanto. For high school, he went to San Sebastian College. He continued his education at Mapua Institute of Technology and University of the East and took the course theater arts.

When his father died from rabies at age 34, Poe became the family's breadwinner. In order to support his family, he dropped out of the University of the East during his sophomore year.

Film career
Poe dropped out of college to work in the Philippine film industry as a messenger boy, and was given acting roles in subsequent years. Starting as a stuntman for Everlasting Pictures, he was given a starring role in the film Anak ni Palaris (Son of Palaris) at the age of 14. The film was not a big hit. In 1956, the film Lo' Waist Gang made him popular, and the film was such a hit that low-waist pants became a fad.

Also known as 'FPJ' from his initials, Poe acted in a number of films which depicted him as the champion of the poor and downtrodden. He also directed films under the pseudonyms D'Lanor and Ronwaldo Reyes. Reyes originated from the surname of his paternal grandmother, Martha.

He established FPJ Productions in 1961 and later organized other film companies. In 1963, he testified against criminal gangs, known as the Big Four, who extorted money from the film industry. In 1965, he shared the lead in The Ravagers (in the Philippines this is titled Only the Brave Know Hell), a film depicting the United States and the Philippines working together against Japanese war time occupation. The film is considered one of the most influential Filipino films.

Poe won the most best actor awards at the FAMAS. Among the films that received awards were Mga Alabok sa Lupa (1967), Asedillo (1971), Durugin si Totoy Bato (1979), Umpisahan Mo, Tatapusin Ko (1983), and Muslim .357 (1986).

Poe was one of the highest paid film actors in the Philippines in the 1980s (alongside Dolphy and Vilma Santos), with his salary reaching over one million pesos per film. In 1988, Poe partnered with San Miguel Corporation in a near  promotional deal for San Miguel Beer, his first endorsement of a product in his entire film career, with the first television commercial airing on January 20.

Among his roles were Flavio in the Ang Panday fantasy series, Kahit Konting Pagtingin, Dito sa Pitong Gatang and Aguila. His last film, Pakners, also stars 9-ball billiards champion Efren "Bata" Reyes.

Political career

2004 Presidential bid
Fernando Poe Jr., was the Koalisyon ng Nagkakaisang Pilipino (KNP)'s candidate for the 2004 presidential election. He accepted nomination in December 2003 and was to be the opposition candidate in the Philippines' 2004 presidential election.

Personal life
Poe married actress Susan Roces, the professional name of Jesusa Sonora, in a civil wedding in December 1968. They later married in a religious service and among their primary sponsors were then-President Ferdinand Marcos and First Lady Imelda. Poe and Roces adopted a daughter, Grace Poe, who became a senator.

Poe was very reclusive about his personal life. However, in February 2004, during the presidential campaign, Poe admitted to having fathered two children out of wedlock. He had an affair with actress Anna Marin and had one son, Ronian and with former actress Rowena Moran and had a daughter, Lourdes Virginia.

Death and legacy

Poe was admitted to St. Luke's Medical Center in Quezon City in the evening of December 11, 2004 after complaining of dizziness at a gathering in his production studio during a Christmas party. He suffered from a stroke and slipped into a coma while being treated for a brain clot. Doctors described his condition as a cerebral thrombosis with multiple organ failure. He died at the age of 65 on December 14 at 12:01 am, without regaining consciousness.
Organizers of the nine-day wake claimed numbers as high as two million. The funeral procession drew tens of thousands who crowded the streets of Quezon City, an event that was reminiscent of the funeral processions of Ninoy Aquino in 1983 and matinee idol Julie Vega in 1985. He was buried in his family plot along with his father and mother in Manila North Cemetery.

On December 14, 2012, eight years after his death, a monument to Poe was erected at the corner of Roxas Boulevard and Arquiza Street, with widow Susan Roces and daughter Grace Poe attending the unveiling.

On January 13, 2022, then-President Rodrigo Duterte signed Republic Act No. 11608, renaming Roosevelt Avenue in Quezon City as Fernando Poe Jr. Avenue.

In popular culture
Fernando Poe Jr. inspired a generation of television and movie impersonators, both serious and comedic. His movie role as the 'Pinoy Robin Hood' and 'People's Champion' in most of his films have repeatedly been clichéd by Filipino action films for years to come.
TV host-comedian Joey de Leon parodied Poe and his iconic film persona (most notably the character of Flavio in "Ang Panday") in many cameo and starring roles. In the comedy film "She-Man, Mistress of the Universe", Poe himself appeared in character (as Flavio) and made a memorable cameo appearance to rescue "Pandoy" (De Leon's character name) against his enemies. De Leon in his Starzan character from the film of the same name made a cameo appearance in Poes' film May Isang Tsuper ng Taxi asking the latter to take him to the forest.
In 2009, Robin Padilla portrayed one of Poes' iconic characters in film in the television adaptation of Carlo J. Caparas' Totoy Bato for GMA-7 the film has had three sequels in film.
Poe is known for his long sideburns which his iconic and signature hairstyle in the Philippines.
In 2015, his 1997 film Ang Probinsyano has been remade by ABS-CBN into a TV series: Ang Probinsyano, starring Coco Martin as the main character to portray twins namely SPO1 Ricardo "Cardo" Dalisay and Police Sr. Insp. Dominador "Ador" de Leon.
In 2016, Richard Gutierrez also portrays Poes' 1980 film, Ang Panday. It was remade by TV5. Richard Gutierrez as Flavio (same as Poe), Miguel, and Juro. Miguel and Juro are the modern versions played by Richard Gutierrez.
Jericho Rosales/Richard Gutierrez (Panday 2005 and 2016), Robin Padilla (Totoy Bato) and Coco Martin (Ang Probinsyano, Batang Quiapo & Panday 2017) are the actors who succeeded Poe as modern action stars.

Filmography

 I Kamao is Poe's only film produced specifically for television, premiering on RPN in June 1987.

Awards and nominations

See also
Fernando Poe Jr. presidential campaign, 2004

Notes

References

External links

Article about his presidential bid
Opinion Article on the man 
Article and photos on his funeral
GMA NEWS.TV, Susan Roces leads rites for FPJ death anniversary 12/14/2007, 11:30 AM
Fernando Poe Jr Bio, Profile, Awards History

1939 births
2004 deaths
20th-century comedians
20th-century Filipino male actors
21st-century Filipino male actors
20th-century philanthropists
Burials at the Manila North Cemetery
Candidates in the 2004 Philippine presidential election
Filipino actor-politicians
Filipino male comedians
Filipino film directors
Filipino male child actors
Filipino male film actors
Filipino people of American descent
Filipino people of Catalan descent
Filipino people of Irish descent
Filipino philanthropists
Filipino Roman Catholics
Male actors from Manila
Mapúa University alumni
National Artists of the Philippines
People from San Carlos, Pangasinan
Fernando
University of the East alumni
Kapampangan people
Filipino film producers
Male actors from Pangasinan